Mikhail Elgin and Igor Zelenay were the defending champions but chose not to defend their title.

Ken and Neal Skupski won the title after defeating Sander Gillé and Joran Vliegen 6–3, 3–6, [10–7] in the final.

Seeds

Draw

References
 Main Draw

Open BNP Paribas Banque de Bretagne - Doubles
2018 Doubles